Konrad Fleck was a thirteenth-century German poet, who wrote in the Alemannic German dialect. Not much is known about his life: he may have been from Alsace or the Basel district.

His works include a version of Floris and Blancheflour.

External links
 
Page on his Flore and Blanschfleur (German language)

German poets
13th-century German poets
German male poets